Julio César De La Cruz Peraza (born 11 August 1989) is a Cuban professional boxer. As an amateur he won gold medals at the 2016 and 2020 Summer Olympics, and the 2011, 2013, 2015, 2017 and 2021 AIBA World Boxing Championships.

Amateur career
At the 2011 World Championships, he captained the Cuban national team, where he beat number 1 seeded Egor Mekhontsev from Russia on points (21–15) in semi-final, and defeated Adilbek Niyazymbetov from Kazakhstan after 3 rounds by 17–13 finishing score in final, being the 4th World amateur boxing champion boxer from Camagüey. He grasped the gold medal at 2011 Pan American Games in which Cuba national team topped the medal table with 8 golds and 1 silver. He beat Carlos Gongora of Ecuador in the semi-finals and Yamaguchi Falcão Florentino of Brazil in the final on points (22–12).

At the 2012 Summer Olympics, he was upset by Falcão Florentino in the quarterfinals in a rematch from the 2011 Pan American Games. At the 2013 World Championships in Almaty, he beat Serge Michel, Oleksandr Ganzulia, Abdelhafid Benchabla and Joe Ward, before again beating Niyazymbetov in the final. On 4 January 2014, Julio Cesar la Cruz was hospitalized after being shot outside of a recreation center in his hometown of Camagüey. In 2015, he again won the gold at the AIBA World Boxing Championships held in Doha.

He won the gold medal at the men's light heavyweight event at the 2016 Summer Olympics. La Cruz sports a 21–3 record in the World Series of Boxing. In the 2020 Summer Olympics, he gained attention for expressing his support for the Cuban government by declaring after his quarterfinal win over a Cuban-born Spanish opponent, "Patria y vida, no. ¡Patria o muerte, venceremos!". After returning to Cuba, La Cruz received a fish and two bottles of soft drink as rewards for his competition in the Olympics. In 2021, he again won the gold at the men's heavyweight held in Tokyo.

Professional boxing record

References

External links

 (archive)

1989 births
Living people
Boxers at the 2011 Pan American Games
Boxers at the 2015 Pan American Games
Boxers at the 2019 Pan American Games
Light-heavyweight boxers
Heavyweight boxers
Pan American Games gold medalists for Cuba
Boxers at the 2012 Summer Olympics
Boxers at the 2016 Summer Olympics
Olympic boxers of Cuba
Cuban male boxers
Sportspeople from Camagüey
AIBA World Boxing Championships medalists
Olympic gold medalists for Cuba
Olympic medalists in boxing
Medalists at the 2016 Summer Olympics
Medalists at the 2020 Summer Olympics
Pan American Games medalists in boxing
Shooting survivors
Central American and Caribbean Games gold medalists for Cuba
Competitors at the 2014 Central American and Caribbean Games
Competitors at the 2018 Central American and Caribbean Games
Central American and Caribbean Games medalists in boxing
Medalists at the 2011 Pan American Games
Medalists at the 2019 Pan American Games
Medalists at the 2015 Pan American Games
Boxers at the 2020 Summer Olympics
21st-century Cuban people